Leo Vainonen (born 26 June 1952) is a Swedish boxer. He competed at the 1976 Summer Olympics and the 1980 Summer Olympics.

References

External links
 

1952 births
Living people
Swedish male boxers
Olympic boxers of Sweden
Boxers at the 1976 Summer Olympics
Boxers at the 1980 Summer Olympics
People from Gävle
Light-middleweight boxers
Sportspeople from Gävleborg County
20th-century Swedish people